Ding Changqin (born 27 November 1991 in Longxi Town 龙溪镇, Yuqing County, Guizhou province) is a Chinese athlete specialising in the long-distance events. She represented her country in the marathon at the 2013 World Championships finishing 19th overall. In addition she won two medals at the 2014 Asian Games.

Competition record

Personal bests
Outdoor
3000 metres – 9:06.2 (Changbaishan 2014)
5000 metres – 15:12.51 (Incheon 2014)
10,000 metres – 31:53.09 (Incheon 2014)
Half marathon – 1:20:01 (Nanning 2010)
Marathon – 2:30:20 (Yingkou 2013)
3000 metres steeplechase – 10:38.50 (Zhaoqing 2008)

References

External links 
 

1991 births
Living people
Chinese female long-distance runners
Chinese female marathon runners
Chinese female steeplechase runners
World Athletics Championships athletes for China
Asian Games medalists in athletics (track and field)
Asian Games silver medalists for China
Asian Games bronze medalists for China
Athletes (track and field) at the 2014 Asian Games
Medalists at the 2014 Asian Games
People from Zunyi
Runners from Guizhou